The UNAF U-20 Tournament is a football (soccer) tournament held between nations who are members of the UNAF association: Algeria, Egypt, Libya, Morocco, and Tunisia. However, the tournament invites teams from other nations.

Summary

UNAF U-19 Tournament

UNAF U-20 Tournament

 A round-robin tournament determined the final standings.

Successful national teams 

* hosts.
° Second tournament

See also 

 UNAF U-23 Tournament
 UNAF U-18 Tournament
 UNAF U-17 Tournament
 UNAF U-15 Tournament

External links 
 UNAF U-20 Tournament history - unaf official website

 
UNAF competitions
Under-20 association football